Frenchtown High School is located in Frenchtown, Missoula County, Montana, United States.

Academic Team
Frenchtown High School's academic team has performed well at regional and statewide levels, placing first out of 16 teams at Brainfreeze in the 2010 & 2011 season. In the 2012 season, Frenchtown took 1st out of 51 teams at the Southwest Montana Academic Olympics and 1st at the Yellowstone County Invitational Academic Tournament. In 2009, the team won the Frenchtown-Stevensville Invitational Academic Tournament and were able to travel to Chicago for the HSNCT. In the 2010 season, Frenchtown hosted a tournament titled Brainfreeze. Frenchtown's #1 team triumphed over teams such as Billings Skyview and Missoula Sentinel to capture first place and qualify for the PACE National Scholastics Championship in Fairfax, Virginia. In 2013, Frenchtown took 1st place at the World Affairs Council Academic Tournament, and has been invited to nationals in Washington D.C. and in 2012. The team finished the Jordan Carlson Memorial Academic Tournament in first, second, third, and fourth place. Over the last few years, Frenchtown's team has developed a friendly rivalry with Billings Skyview, as well as Park High Livingston. Frenchtown's first venture into academic competition began with the Brainbuster program on KECI-TV, which lasted three years.

Softball

In the 2009 season, the Broncs softball team were Class A State Champions.

Fall Sports
Boys Cross Country
Girls Cross Country
Boys Golf
Girls Golf
Boys Soccer
Girls Soccer
Football (Won state in Class A during the 2009 season)
Girls Volleyball

Winter Sports
Boys Basketball
Girls Basketball
Wrestling

Spring Sports
Softball
Boys Track and Field
Girls Track and Field

See also

Notes

External links
Frenchtown School District Website
The webpage of Frenchtown's Academic Teams, including a roster, schedule, and lexicon

Public high schools in Montana
Schools in Missoula County, Montana